Lionel John Cornish (25 December 1879 – 18 April 1939) was a British athlete. He competed in the men's long jump at the 1908 Summer Olympics.

References

1879 births
1939 deaths
Athletes (track and field) at the 1908 Summer Olympics
British male long jumpers
Olympic athletes of Great Britain
Place of birth missing